The Assisi Network was an underground network in Italy established by Catholic clergy to protect Jews during the Nazi Occupation. The churches, monasteries, and convents of Assisi served as a safe haven for several hundred Jews.

General History of Assisi 
Holocaust historian Martin Gilbert credits the Assisi Network, established by Bishop Giuseppe Placido Nicolini and Father Rufino Nicacci, with saving 300 Jews.

When the Nazis began to murder Jews, Monsignor Nicolini, Bishop of Assisi, under orders from Monsignor Montini, ordered Father Aldo Brunacci to lead a rescue operation using shelters in 26 monasteries and convents, and providing false transit papers. Many of the papers claimed the person was from Southern Italy, an area liberated by American forces. Among those that were helped by Nicolini were the Baruch, Viterbi and Kropf families.

Nicolini hid Jews in places that were regularly closed to outsiders by papal monastic regulations. His "Committee of Assistance" transformed Assisi into a shelter for many Jews, and assisted others with transit through the town to other places of safety. Respect for Jewish religious practices saw Yom Kippur celebrated at Assisi in 1943, with nuns preparing the meal to end the fast.

The activities of the network were the subject of a 1978 book, The Assisi Underground by Alexander Ramati, and a 1985 film starring Ben Cross and James Mason as Bishop Nicolini.

Assisi was liberated on June 16, 1944.

Righteous among the Nations: Father Aldo Brunacci 

Father Aldo Brunacci was the head of the Committee for Assistance and a canon in the Cathedral of San Rufino. He was recognized as Righteous among the Nations by Yad Vashem's publication in the year of 1977. Brunacci owned a huge library where he taught Latin to several people, including Mira Baruch, that enabled her to resume her studies after the war.

On May 15, 1944, Father Brunacci was arrested by governor Rocchi Perugia, who suspected his involvement in the rescue missions. Through the Bishop of Assisi's intervention, Brunacci was released, but forced to leave Assisi.

Testimony of Father Aldo Brunacci is available here

Famous Quotes 

 "God is our father and we are all brothers and sisters."
 "There are times in everyone's life in which it is easy to confuse prudence with a calm life; there are times when heroism is required. Monsignor Nicolini took the path of heroism."

Pope Pius XII and the Holocaust 

The actions of Pope Pius XII, also known as Eugenio Pacelli (1876-1958), during the Holocaust remain highly controversial. He kept a public front of neutrality. Though he made public speeches condemning injustices of the world, Pope Pius XII did not take any direct or public action against Hitler and the Nazi regime. He privately sheltered a small number of Jews and encouraged select officials to help Jews.

In 1933, while a cardinal, before being elected Pope, Pracelli signed a concordant with German diplomat Franz Von Papen that was considered a diplomatic victory for Hitler, and granted freedom of practice to the Roman Catholic church. In return, the Church was to abstain from political issues.

Pacelli was elected Pope on March 2, 1939 and began speaking out against the 1938 Italian racial laws, though he did not condemn Kristallnacht. In that same month, Pius obtained 3,000 visas for European Jews who converted to Catholicism to enter Brazil. Two thousand of the visas were later revoked because those Jews continued to practice Judaism in Brazil. The Pope did not take any action on the revocations.

Between 1940 and 1943, Pope Pius was confronted with demands to denounce the Nazi violence from individuals including: Chief Rabbi of Palestine, Isaac Herzog; Cardinal Theodor Innitzer of Vienna; Assistant Chief of the U.S. delegation to the Vatican, Harold Tittman; Ukrainian Metropolitan Andrej Septyckyj; Monsignor Giovanni Battista Montini, Wladislaw Raczkiewicz, president of the Polish government-in-exile; and Bishop Preysing of Berlin. The Church responded to these demands by stressing the Church's need to remain neutral.

Any aid that the Pope provided Jews came after 1942 when US joined the war. At that time, Pope Pius began encouraging German and Hungarian bishops to speak out against the massacre of the Jews.

Viterbi Family
The Viterbi family were able to live openly due to the false papers of identification provided by Brizi. In the papers they registered as residents of the town of Lecce, an area that was already liberated by the Americans, thus preventing the Nazi's from checking the papers validity.

Grazia Viterbi's name was changed to Graziella Vitelli. However, even with the false papers and safe area of residence, the family was in a constant fear of capture by the Nazis. To familiarize herself in the event of capture, Grazia learned about the town of Lecce at the Assisi library.

See also

Catholic resistance to Nazism
Italian Resistance
Pope Pius XII 
Pope Pius XII and the Holocaust

References

External links 

Assisi Network published by Yad Vashem.
The Assisi Network; published by Rome Reports.
www.catholicnewsagency.com, News, Europe, Holocaust survivor thanks pope, Oct. 5,2013.
Pope Pius and the Holocaust

Organizations which rescued Jews during the Holocaust
Catholic resistance to Nazi Germany
Pope Pius XII and the Holocaust
Italian resistance movement